Basri Çapriqi (1960-2018) was an Albanian poet and literary critic. 

He was born in Krute (Krytha) in Ulcinj Municipality (Ulqin), present-day Montenegro and studied Albanian language and literature at the University of Pristina. He was professor of style, semiotics and contemporary poetry at the Academy of Arts of Kosovo. He published seven anthologies of poetry and five works on literary criticism. Since 2012 he was a member of the Academy of Sciences of Albania. He has been considered a leading poet in the Albanian community in Montenegro.

References

1960 births
2018 deaths
Albanian poets
People from Ulcinj
Members of the Academy of Sciences of Albania
Albanians in Montenegro